Allen's Corners is an unincorporated community in Kane County, Illinois, United States. Allen's Corner is a landmark of the Allen family, the first settlers of Kane County in 1836.  First known as blacksmiths and farmers, the towing business was started in 1937. The community is located at the intersection of U.S. Route 20 and Allen and Brier Hill roads.

References

Unincorporated communities in Illinois
Unincorporated communities in Kane County, Illinois